Jinks Island is an island lying  north of Pickwick Island, in the Pitt Islands of the Biscoe Islands, Antarctica. Shown on an Argentine government chart of 1957, it was named by the UK Antarctic Place-Names Committee in 1959 after Mr. Jinks, a character in Charles Dickens' The Pickwick Papers.

See also 
 List of Antarctic and sub-Antarctic islands

References

Islands of the Biscoe Islands